Melissa Hayden may refer to:
Melissa Hayden (dancer) (1923–2006), Canadian dancer
Melissa Hayden (actress) (born 1969), American actress
Melissa Hayden (poker player), American poker player